"Shake It" is a song by Australian dance duo, Kaylan. It was released in August 2000 as the second single from their debut album, No Commandments (2000). The song peaked at number 15 on the ARIA Charts, becoming the band's second top-twenty single.

Track listing
Australian CD single (8573839307)
 "Shake It"	
 "Shake It" (Studio 347 R'N'B Mix)	
 "Shake It" (Studio 347 Dance Mix)	
 "Shake It" (Chili Hi Fly Mix)

Weekly charts

References

2000 singles
Disco Montego songs
2000 songs